Hanover Acceptances Limited is a holding company founded 1974 by Manfred Gorvy.

Companies:
 Dorrington Plc
 Refresco Gerber
 African Realty Trust
 Fresh Capital

References

Companies based in the Royal Borough of Kensington and Chelsea
Holding companies of the United Kingdom
Holding companies established in 1974
1974 establishments in England
British companies established in 1974